Tor Leisure Ground, previously known as Morlands Athletic Ground until 1986, is a former first-class cricket ground located in Glastonbury, Somerset.  It hosted first-class matches for Somerset County Cricket Club between 1952 – 1973, and List A cricket between 1969 – 1978.  It has been the home of Glastonbury Cricket Club since at least 1893, when the first recorded match was played on the ground.  The highest individual first-class score made on the ground was 187* by Glamorgan's Alan Jones in a 1963 County Championship match.

The ground was formerly owned by the Morlands company, which was a major employer making sheepskin clothing in the town from 1870 to the mid-1980s.

References

External links
 
 

Cricket grounds in Somerset
Glastonbury
Sports venues completed in 1893